is a Japanese singer-songwriter and actor from Toyonaka, Osaka Prefecture. She was signed to King Records (Japan) until January, 2015. She debuted in 2013 with the single "Scramble".

Career
Sayoko Izumi was born in Toyonaka, Osaka, Japan, on October 28, 1988, but she went to grade school in Okayama Prefecture. She wanted to be a singer ever since she was 6 years old and auditioned for groups, such as Morning Musume, since she was 13 years old.

On May 26, 2012, she participated in King Records's 80th annual vocal audition called "KING RECORDS Presents Dream Vocal Audition", which took place at Akasaka BLITZ in Tokyo. She was one of the three winners of the audition, picked by with, and given the title "DREAM VOCALIST Loved by with".  She signed a recording contract with King Records after winning. Songs by Izumi Sayoko were used in various King Records supported movies.

Her first release was a single titled "Scramble", which was released on November 21, 2012. The title song "Scramble" was used for the movie Karasu no Oyayubi.
Her second release was a single titled "Kyōkai-sen/Iris", which came out on January 30, 2013.  "Kyōkai-sen" was used in the movie Sayonara Debussy, which came out on January 26 of that year.
On June 12, 2013, her third single "Tegami" came out, and was used in the movie and was used in the movie "The Serialist", which was based on the book by David Gordon (novelist).
Her final release with King Records was "Kasu", which came out on January 15, 2014.  This song was also used in the movie "Yokohama Monogatari", which Sayoko Izumi also co-starred in.

On November 7, 2014, she changed the Chinese characters of her name from "泉沙世子" to "泉彩世子".
"Ai no Uta", released on January 16, 2015, was her first release as an independent artist.

Discography

Singles

Filmography

Films

References

External links
Sayoko Izumi's official website 2015~ 
Sayoko Izumi's official website, 2012-2015 
King Records' official webpage for Sayoko Izumi 

1988 births
Living people
Japanese film actresses
Japanese lyricists
Japanese women pop singers
Japanese women singer-songwriters
Japanese singer-songwriters
People from Toyonaka, Osaka
King Records (Japan) artists
Musicians from Osaka Prefecture
21st-century Japanese singers
21st-century Japanese women singers